Mékambo Airport  is an airport serving the village of Mékambo in the Ogooué-Ivindo Province of Gabon.

See also

 List of airports in Gabon
 Transport in Gabon

References

External links
Mékambo Airport
OpenStreetMap - Mékambo
OurAirports - Mékambo
HERE/Nokia - Mékambo

Airports in Gabon